The 2011 Gerry Weber Open was a tennis tournament played on outdoor grass courts. It was the 19th edition of the event known that year as the Gerry Weber Open and was part of the ATP World Tour 250 series of the 2011 ATP World Tour. It took place at the Gerry Weber Stadion in Halle, Germany, between 6 June and 12 June 2011. Unseeded Philipp Kohlschreiber won the singles title.

Finals

Singles

 Philipp Kohlschreiber defeated  Philipp Petzschner 7–6(7–5), 2–0 ret.
It was Kohlschreiber's 1st title of the year and 3rd of his career. It was the first all-German final since Los Angeles in 2004.

Doubles

 Rohan Bopanna /  Aisam-ul-Haq Qureshi defeated  Robin Haase /  Milos Raonic, 7–6(10–8), 3–6, [11–9]

Entries

Seeds

 Seedings are based on the rankings of May 30, 2011.

Other entrants
The following players received wildcards into the singles main draw:
  Dustin Brown
  Tommy Haas
  Mischa Zverev

The following players received entry from the qualifying draw:

  Ruben Bemelmans
  Jan Hernych
  Florent Serra
  Cedrik-Marcel Stebe

The following players received wildcards into the singles main draw:
  Dominik Meffert
  Leonardo Mayer

Notable withdrawals
  Robin Söderling (muscular problems) 
  Jürgen Melzer (back injury) 
  Roger Federer (groin injury)
  Mikhail Youzhny (left foot injury)

References

External links
Official website

 
Halle Open
Gerry Weber Open
2011 in German tennis